Drömling is a sparsely populated depression on the border of Lower Saxony and Saxony-Anhalt in Germany with an area of about . The larger part belonging to Saxony-Anhalt in the east has been a nature park since 1990. The former swampland was transformed  by drainage from a natural into a cultural landscape in the 18th century under the direction of Frederick the Great of Prussia. Today the depression, with its waterways, the Mittelland Canal and the rivers Aller and Ohre is a refuge for rare or endangered species of animal and plant. Most of the area is now made up of nature reserves and protected areas. Nearby towns include Oebisfelde and Wolfsburg.

Location 
Drömling lies in a flat hollow measuring about 15 to 20 kilometres across and surrounding by a 60-metre contour. It is a wider section of the Breslau-Magdeburg-Bremen glacial valley. In broad terms it stretches from Wolfsburg-Vorsfelde in the west to Calvörde in the east and from Klötze in the north to Oebisfelde in the south. To the west the geest ridges of the Vorsfelder Werder border on the Drömling.

Drömling extends over the following districts: Salzwedel, Börde, Gifhorn, Wolfsburg and Helmstedt.

See also 
 List of nature parks in Germany

Sources 
 Heinz Frenkler: Der Drömling in Naturschutzgebiete im Raum Gifhorn-Wolfsburg, Großkopf-Verlag, Wolfsburg 1986, 
 Helmut Maigatter: Land der tausend Gräben – Aus der Geschichte des Drömlings. 2. Auflage 1997, gedruckt in Helmstedt, ohne ISBN
 Naturschutz im Land Sachsen-Anhalt, Sonderheft: Der Naturpark Drömling. Landesamt für Umweltschutz Sachsen-Anhalt, Abteilung Naturschutz, Halle 1993, ISSN 0940-6638
 Ernst Andreas Friedrich: Naturdenkmale Niedersachsens. Hanover 1980.

References

External links 
 Drömling Biosphere Reserve website (in German)
 Landscape fact file Bundesamt für Naturschutz (in German)
 Aktion Drömling Schutz
 Description of the nature reserve of Wendschotter and Vorsfelder Drömling at the NLWKN

Nature parks in Germany
Nature reserves in Saxony-Anhalt
Nature reserves in Lower Saxony
Forests and woodlands of Saxony-Anhalt
Forests and woodlands of Lower Saxony
Protected landscapes in Germany